Taurolema flavocincta is a species of beetle in the family Cerambycidae. It was described by Gounelle in 1906. It is known from Ecuador, Colombia, Brazil, Panama, Costa Rica, and Peru.

References

Mauesiini
Beetles described in 1906